Indian Ocean Drive is a coastal highway in the Australian state of Western Australia which services the coastal communities along the Indian Ocean immediately north of the state capital Perth, linking the northern suburb of Yanchep with the Brand Highway, just south of Dongara. In terms of regions, most of it exists in the Wheatbelt coastal region. The road provides travellers between Perth and Geraldton a 30-minute shorter and more scenic route than the inland Brand Highway which mainly services heavy traffic.

History
The section was completed at a cost of $95 million. On completion of the extension, State Route 60 was extended along the length of the road.

In December 2010, the state's Geographic Names Committee, on behalf of the Shire of Gingin, requested that the City of Wanneroo rename the northern section of Wanneroo Road to Indian Ocean Drive. A motion was put forward at the 14 December 2010 council meeting to rename the section from Yanchep Beach Road north to the intersection of Gingin Brook Road, reasoning that terminating Wanneroo Road at Yanchep National Park would "be good for tourism". However, Mayor Jon Kelly considered the proposal a "futile and worthless exercise that was tantamount to heresy". Other councillors called it "offensive to the pioneers" of Wanneroo, and wished to retain the name Wanneroo in the area's only main road. An alternative motion stating that the council "does not agree" to renaming the road was passed instead. However, a subsequent renaming request was passed and the name Indian Ocean Drive was extended down to Yanchep Beach Road in 2011.

The road, mainly the section between Yanchep and Lancelin, has been the scene of multiple car accidents. There have been at least nine fatalities and 41 people taken to hospital as a result of crashes along Indian Ocean Drive since 2014.

Localities on coast
From the Perth metropolitan region that ceases before Yanchep: -
 Two Rocks
 Guilderton
 Seabird
 Ledge Point
 Lancelin
 Wedge Island
 Grey
 Cervantes
 Jurien Bay
 Green Head
 Leeman
 Coolimba
 Illawong
 Port Denison
 Dongara

Major intersections

See also 

 The Pinnacles

References

External links 

Roads in Western Australia